Sphagesaurus is an extinct genus of sphagesaurid notosuchian crocodylomorph from the Late Cretaceous of southwest São Paulo, southern Brazil.

Species and discovery
Sphagesaurus was first described and named by Llewellyn Ivor Price in 1950 and the type species is S. huenei. S. huenei was described by Price (1950) on the basis of two isolated molariform maxillary teeth, the holotype DGM 332-R and the referred specimen DGM 333-R. The holotype was found in a railway cut between the cities of Presidente Bernardes and Santo Anastacio in the state of São Paulo, while DGM 333-R was found near Catanduva city of São Paulo, both from the Bauru Group. Bertini et al. (1993) referred the isolated molariform tooth, URC-R 015 from Locality 99 of the Adamantina Formation, to S. huenei, and referred the DGM specimens to the same formation.

Kellner et al. (1995) and Kellner & Campos (1999) tentatively assigned DGM 1411-R, a nearly complete but crushed anterior portion of the skull and lower jaw, to S. huenei and then to S. sp. It was found near Presidente Prudente city of southwest São Paulo, from the Adamantina Formation of the Bauru Basin. It was reassigned to a new genus and species, Caryonosuchus pricei, by Kellner et al. (2011). They also considered the type material of S. huenei to be undiagnosable, making the species a nomen dubium.

Pol (2003) described the only diagnosable specimen, RCL-100 a nearly complete skull, that is currently considered to belong to Sphagesaurus. It consists of the rostrum, orbital and temporal regions, except for its dorsal elements. A mandibular fragment corresponding to the dentary symphysis was found in natural occluding position. The specimen was collected at the sediments of the Adamantina Formation during the construction of the new railroad station of  Buenopolis city of São Paulo.

A second species, S. montealtensis has also been described from the Late Cretaceous of Brazil. It was named by Marco Brandalise de Andrade and Reinaldo J. Bertini in 2008, on the basis of MPMA 15-001/90, a nearly complete skull and mandible preserved in occlusion. It was collected from the Bairro Cachoeira locality at the base of the Serra da Água Limpa, about 8 km northwest of Monte Alto city of northern São Paulo, from the Adamantina Formation. In 2013, this specimen was reassigned to the closely related notosuchian genus Caipirasuchus, creating the combinatio nova Caipirasuchus montealtensis. The type species of the genus, C. paulistanus, is known only from the holotype specimen MPMA 67-0001/00, an almost complete and undeformed skull and mandible with teeth (only three teeth are missing) and partial postcranium, from a single individual. It was found on the São Francisco Farm, in Homem de Mello, the rural area of Monte Alto County, also from the Adamantina Formation. S. montealtensis was reassigned Caipirasuchus on the basis of a newly discovered specimen referrable to it. MPMA 68-0003/12 consists of a nearly complete cranium and mandible and a posterior portion of the post-cranium. It was discovered in the municipality of Catanduva, northern São Paulo, from the Adamantina Formation. At least five synapomorphies unite the species, and a phylogenetic analysis found them to be sister taxa.

References

Late Cretaceous crocodylomorphs of South America
Terrestrial crocodylomorphs
Sphagesaurids
Adamantina Formation
Prehistoric pseudosuchian genera